The Metropolis of Lyon, also known as  ("Greater Lyon"), is a French territorial collectivity located in the east-central region of Auvergne-Rhône-Alpes. It is a directly elected metropolitan authority encompassing the city of Lyon and most of its suburbs. It had a population of 1,411,571 in 2019, 37% of whom lived in the city of Lyon proper.

It replaced the Urban Community of Lyon on 1 January 2015, in accordance with the  enacted in January 2014. The first direct metropolitan elections were held in March (1st round) and June (2nd round) 2020, leading to a victory by Europe Ecology – The Greens. The president of the metropolitan council has been Green leader Bruno Bernard since July 2020.

Geography 

It covers the city of Lyon and its main suburbs. The rivers Rhône and Saône flow through it. It borders the department Rhône to the northwest and southwest, Ain to the northeast and Isère to the southeast.

Communes 

The Lyon Metropolis consists of 59 communes. The most populous commune is Lyon. As of 2019, there are 9 communes with more than 30,000 inhabitants:

See also
Parks in Lyon
Metropolitan Council of Lyon

References

External links

 Metropolitan Lyon website (in French)
 The Greater Lyon official business website (in English)
  (in French)

 
~
Departments of Auvergne-Rhône-Alpes
States and territories established in 2015
2015 establishments in France